Great Western Highway (also known as Broadway from  to , Parramatta Road from Chippendale to , and Church Street through Parramatta) is a  state highway in New South Wales, Australia. From east to west, the highway links Sydney with Bathurst, on the state's Central Tablelands.

Route
The eastern terminus of Great Western Highway is at Railway Square, at the intersection of Broadway with Quay Street, in the inner-city suburb of Haymarket and just south of the Sydney CBD. From Railway Square, the highway follows Broadway south and west, to the intersection with City Road (Princes Highway), where the highway changes name to Parramatta Road and heads generally west towards Parramatta. Hume Highway (Liverpool Road) branches south-west at Summer Hill/Ashfield, and a short distance further west the majority of traffic is diverted off the highway onto M4 Western Motorway via the WestConnex tunnel at Ashfield. A short distance further west, on the northern fringes of Ashfield, the City West Link arterial road ends at a major junction with the highway at Frederick Street (which proceeds south to join Hume Highway).

The highway continues west as Parramatta Road, with a major intersection at Homebush West with the A3 arterial road. Although the A3 road is called "Centenary Drive" in this area, the on-/off-ramps are separately named Marlborough Road, carrying on the name of the surface road that was replaced by Centenary Drive. Further west, on the boundary between Lidcombe and Auburn, the highway intersects the A6 arterial road (St Hillier's Road / Silverwater Road).

At , M4 Western Motorway reconnects with the highway as it begins its ascent into the Blue Mountains. It intersects with Darling Causeway at Mount Victoria which heads north to connect with Bells Line of Road. From Mount Victoria, the highway descends via Victoria Pass into the Hartley Valley and then passes through the western suburbs of Lithgow where it is joined by the Chifley Road, which links eastward back to Bells Line of Road. The highway continues generally west, intersecting with Castlereagh Highway west of Marrangaroo, and crosses Coxs River to ascend the Great Dividing Range to reach its highest point (at  just east of Yetholme) and over the western ridge of the Sydney basin before dropping into the Macquarie Valley to reach its western terminus at Bathurst, at the junction of the Mitchell and Mid-Western Highways.

At numerous points along its journey, the highway transverses or is transversed by the Main Western railway line. Major river crossings occur east of Emu Plains (Nepean), near Wallerawang (Coxs), and east of Bathurst (Macquarie).

It consists of two of Australia's most historic roads – Parramatta Road, and the full length of the former Great Western Road, from Parramatta to Bathurst.

History

Colonial establishment

Sydney CBD to Parramatta and Penrith

Initial travel between Sydney and the settlement of Parramatta was by water along the Parramatta River. Sometime between 1789 and 1791 an overland track was made to provide an official land route between the two settlements. Parramatta Road dates to the 1792 formation of a route linking Sydney to the settlement of Parramatta, formalised under the direction of Surveyor-General Augustus Alt in 1797. Parramatta Road became one of the colony's most important early roadways, and for many years remained one of Sydney's premier thoroughfares. By 1810, Parramatta Road had officially open to traffic and was financed during a large portion of the 1800s by a toll, with toll booths located at what now is Sydney University and the Duck River.

Emu Plains to Mount Victoria

In 1813, acting on the instructions of Governor of New South Wales Lachlan Macquarie, Gregory Blaxland, William Lawson and William Wentworth led an 1813 expedition that travelled west from Emu Plains and, by staying to the ridges, were able to confirm the existence of a passable route directly west from Sydney across the Blue Mountains. The existence of other, less direct routes had been known as far back as 1797, but due to the need to prevent convicts from believing that escape from the hemmed-in Sydney region was possible, knowledge of the expeditions confirming the existence of routes across the Blue Mountains was suppressed. From this point they were able to see that the worst of the almost impenetrable terrain of the Blue Mountains was behind them, and that there were easy routes available to reach the rolling countryside they could see off to the west.

Mount Victoria to Bathurst

Macquarie then despatched Surveyor George Evans to follow Blaxland, Lawson and Wentworth's route and to push further west until he reached arable land. Evans travelled west until he reached the Fish River, and followed it downstream until he reached the site of Bathurst. Within a year, Macquarie commissioned William Cox to construct a road west from Emu Plains, following Evans' route, and this road was finished in 1815. Macquarie himself travelled across it soon after completion, established and named Bathurst, and named the road the Great Western Road.

West of Mount Victoria, Evans' route has been superseded, chiefly by Mitchell's new route constructed between 1832 and 1836.

Route development
Continuing due west from Flemington, it crossed Duck River near the present Mona Street bridge, turning north near the present Granville Park to finish at George Street in Parramatta, between Pitt and Church Streets. This was deviated circa 1840 to follow the present route. Few traces of the original route remain.

At Mount Victoria, at the western edge of the Blue Mountains, the route of Cox's road turned north to Mount York, from where it descended into the Hartley Valley. This pass was the major piece of engineering on the original route, and when Macquarie travelled the new road in 1815, he named it Cox's Pass in honour of the builder. From the foot of Mount York the road resumed its westerly direction to where  now stands.

For the first one hundred years after this ceased to be the route of the Great Western Road it remained trafficable, but the destruction of the bridge at Phil's Falls on the Fish River in 1930 meant it was no longer a through route, and parts became untrafficable. However, most of this route remains in existence as a series of local roads.

The original route had only been in existence for eight years when, in 1823, Assistant Surveyor James McBrian identified an improved route on the approaches to Bathurst. The section from south of O'Connell to Kelso is now part of the Bathurst-Oberon Road, and from Kelso into central Bathurst still remains as part of Great Western Highway.

When Major Thomas Mitchell was appointed as Surveyor-General in 1828, one of the first matters to which he turned his attention was the improvement of the Great Western Road. Mitchell's attention was focussed on providing a more direct and easily graded route for the Great Western Road. To this end, he surveyed a route running northwest from Hartley via Mt Walker to Meadow Flat, crossing the Great Dividing Range at Mount Lambie, then running in an almost straight line westward via Browns Hill to Kelso, to meet the pre-existing road. This road remains in existence – from Mount Lambie west it remains as the route of the current highway (with deviations) but the section adjacent to Cox's River was inundated by the construction of Lake Lyell for Wallerawang Power Station in the late 1970s.

Mitchell was also concerned to improve the worst sections of the road, which were the climb from the Cumberland Plain, on which Sydney sits, and the descent of Mount York, down the western side of the Blue Mountains.

In improving the eastern ascent Mitchell adhered largely to Cox's route, which follows the southern side of an east-falling gully to reach the plateau at where  is now located. However, he engaged Scottish engineer David Lennox to build a stone arch bridge, now the Lennox Bridge, across the mouth of a particularly deep side gully. This route, known as Mitchell's Pass, was completed in 1833 and superseded what is now called Old Bathurst Road, located to the north of the route. The Mitchell's Pass and Lennox Bridge served as the main route to the Blue Mountains for 93 years until 1926, when the Great Western Highway was re-routed via sections of the former Lapstone Zig Zag including the Knapsack Viaduct.

After protracted arguments first with Governor Ralph Darling and then his successor Richard Bourke, and ignoring orders, Mitchell surveyed, designed and had built what is now known as Victoria Pass, where the highway drops from the Blue Mountains into the Hartley Valley. Midway down the road had to be supported on a causeway formed by massive stone buttressed walls, where a narrow ridge connects two large bluffs. This ridge had to be widened and raised to give the highway a route from the upper to the lower bluff. Mitchell cut terraces into the sides of these bluffs to form a passage for the road. It is a testimony of Mitchell's vision and engineering skill that this route, almost unchanged, and using his 1832 stonework, is still in use. Because this pass brought the road into the Hartley Valley several kilometres south of the Mount York descent, it necessitated a new route as far west as Hartley to meet Cox's Road. This also is still in use as part of the highway.

In 1929 the Main Roads Board deviated the route north from Old Bowenfels to Marrangaroo, using Trunk Road 55 (Mudgee Road, today Castlereagh Highway). From Marrangaroo a new road was built westward, running south of Wallerawang to meet Mitchell's 1830 deviation immediately east of Mount Lambie. This route avoids the long, steep gradients either side of Cox's River, which were the main drawback of Mitchell's route.

Road classification
The passing of the Main Roads Act of 1924 through the Parliament of New South Wales provided for the declaration of Main Roads, roads partially funded by the State government through the Main Roads Board (later the Department of Main Roads, and eventually Transport for NSW). Great Western Highway was declared (as Main Road No. 5) on 8 August 1928, from the interchange with Parramatta Road and City Road in the City of Sydney, via Penrith, Katoomba, and Lithgow to Bathurst; with the passing of the Main Roads (Amendment) Act of 1929 to provide for additional declarations of State Highways and Trunk Roads, this was amended to State Highway 5 on 8 April 1929. Its eastern end was extended to the intersection of Broadway and Wattle Street on 22 February 1967 (part of Sydney's Ring Road 1 at the time). It was extended east again to its current terminus at Railway Square in Haymarket on 22 January 1993.

As the main route for traffic from the Blue Mountains into Sydney was superseded from Great Western Highway to the Western Freeway/Motorway from the 1970s, the definition of Great Western Highway as State Highway 5 outside inner Sydney remained virtually untouched, until the western extension of Western Freeway from Emu Plains to Lapstone in June 1993, resulting in a roughly-2km gap between the beginning of the motorway and the interchange with Russell Street where the highway recommences.

The passing of the Roads Act of 1993 updated road classifications and the way they could be declared within New South Wales. Under this act, Great Western Highway today retains its declaration as Highway 5, from the intersection of Broadway and Quay Streets at Railway Square in Haymarket to the interchange with M4 Western Motorway at Leonay, then from the end of Western Motorway at the interchange with Governors Drive at Lapstone to Bathurst.

Improvements

During 19th century
The first recorded major improvement to the route of Great Western Highway was the construction in 1806 of ten bridges along Parramatta Road.

In attempts to improve the gradient of the descent from the Blue Mountains plateau to the floor of the Hartley Valley, Lawson's Long Alley was opened in 1824. This still did not prove satisfactory and construction of a second deviation, known as Lockyer's Pass, was commenced. However this route was not completed, as its construction was abandoned in favour of construction of Mitchell's route via Victoria Pass.

Originally the Great Western Road crossed the Nepean River at Penrith by means of a ferry adjacent to the Log Cabin Hotel. This was superseded in 1856 by a bridge which was destroyed by a flood in 1857. A second bridge was opened in 1860, and was destroyed by the record flood of 1867. In the same year a new bridge, Victoria Bridge, was nearing completion adjacent to the road crossing, as part of the Penrith-Weatherboard (Wentworth Falls) section of the Main Western Railway. Its deck was modified to accommodate road traffic as well as the single-track railway. This bridge continued in dual use until 1907 when the current steel truss railway bridge was built alongside, and the 1867 bridge was given over solely to road traffic. This bridge remains in use for Great Western Highway. The design of this bridge is almost identical to that of the 1863 Menangle Railway Bridge, also over the Nepean River.

In 1870 the Denison Bridge, a wrought iron truss bridge, was built across the Macquarie River at Bathurst. This replaced an earlier wooden bridge.

During early 20th century
In the first few years of the 20th century the railway overpasses between Lapstone Hill and Mount Victoria were replaced as part of the duplication of the Main Western railway. These bridges were of brick arch construction. They were in turn replaced in the mid-1950s to obtain the necessary height clearances for overhead wiring for the electrification of the Main Western Railway from Penrith to Bowenfels.

In 1912 Victoria Pass was superseded by Berghofers Pass, which followed a similar route to Victoria Pass, but below it. It was more winding and thus longer, thereby affording a less steep climb. However rapid improvements in motor vehicle performance meant that in 1920 Victoria Pass was rebuilt to become the main route again.

After the ascent of the eastern escarpment by the Main Western Railway was deviated for the second time in 1913 to its current route via Glenbrook Gorge, the Great Western Road was also deviated at this point for a second time in 1926 by the then Main Roads Board, which rerouted it via the disused 1867 stone arch railway viaduct across Knapsack Gully and around the southern side of Lapstone Hill to gain the first plateau in the ascent of the Blue Mountains. As this viaduct had held only a single railway track, its deck was widened in 1939 to its present two lane configuration. The viaduct was closed to motor traffic when the M4 Motorway was extended west from Russell Street to connect to the highway at Lapstone in 1994.

West of Knapsack Gully, although now widened to four lanes, the 1926 route of the highway is still in use. It uses a long stretch of abandoned railway formation – the section from Zig Zag Street to Blaxland station is located on the original 1867 railway alignment. An indication of the need to divert the railway can be gained from the gradient of the highway as it climbs west from Hare Street to Lovett Street.

A number of deviations were built in 1929:
 at Haslams Creek, to straighten the road and provide a new bridge
 at Eusdale, Yetholme (in three sections) and Melrose (all west of Meadow Flat), to ease gradients.

In 1930 the level crossing at Bowenfels was replaced by an underpass.

Victoria Pass was upgraded in 1932 to give a constant width of 8.5 m, with a minor deviation built at the foot of the pass.

Upgrading since World War II
In 1957 a short deviation immediately west of Linden eliminated two narrow overpasses of the railway, both of which had right angle bend approaches from both directions. These bridges would have had to have been replaced in any event to allow for overhead wiring for the electrification to Bowenfels of the Main Western Railway. Such replacements occurred east of Linden, further west of Linden near Bull's Camp, east of Lawson, at Medlow Bath and east of Mount Victoria, and in these cases the replacement bridges were located at a skew angle to eliminate right angle bend approaches, with the earlier bridges left for pedestrian use.

In 1958 the 'Forty Bends’, where the Highway runs along the foot of Hassans Walls approaching Lithgow, were eased. The fact that this section of the highway is on the southern side of a very high escarpment poses severe ice problems during winter, due to the lack of sunlight.

In the early 1960s the highway was deviated east of Leura to cross under the railway at Scott Parade (which was itself part of the former highway route) and run along the north side of the railway to rejoin the previous route at Leura Mall.

In 1967, the highway was deviated to bypass Springwood shopping centre, eliminating two narrow underpasses of the railway from the highway route. The previous route remain in use for local traffic as Macquarie Road. In 1968 a dual carriageway 3 km deviation was opened at Prospect. This replaced the only winding section of the Highway between Parramatta and Penrith. The bypassed section was heritage-listed in 2014 as the best-preserved section of the 1818 alignment.

From the late 1960s to the early 1970s the highway was almost entirely realigned and constructed to three lanes, being deviated as necessary, between Kirkconnell and Glanmire. Ironically this included reinstatement of most of the parts of Major Mitchell's 1830 alignment which had been deviated in 1929 to ease gradients.

This work was extended eastward to Mount Lambie in stages during the late 1980s and early 1990s. A second Cox's River deviation, to replace the 1929 deviation, was completed in 1993, between Marrangaroo and Mount Lambie.

At Katoomba the highway was deviated in 1985 to travel along the eastern side of the railway station, whereas the original alignment crossed the railway via a level crossing at the north end of Katoomba Street and ran along the western side of the railway. Immediately west of where the highway now crosses the railway due to this deviation, the highway was realigned over a distance of 1 km in 2004 to remove the sharp bend at 'Shell Corner'.

In Bathurst, the Denison Bridge (1870) was bypassed in 1991 by a realignment of the Highway where it crosses the Macquarie River into Bathurst city centre. Because of its heritage value it was retained for use by cyclists and pedestrians.

During 1991–1993 a massive cutting was made to improve and widen the alignment of the highway immediately east of Woodford. At the top of the southern side of this cutting can be seen the rudimentary excavation of the rock for Cox's 1815 road. This was severed in 1868 by the construction of the Springwood-Mount Victoria section of the Main Western Railway. The railway itself was deviated at this point in the 1920s when it was duplicated, and a cutting on the original alignment of the railway now forms the top section of the southern face of the highway cutting, the terrace in the face of the cutting being the bed of the original cutting.

In June 1993 the highway route was severed at Emu Plains with the closure to road traffic of the Knapsack Gully Viaduct. This occurred in conjunction with the westward extension of the M4 Motorway from its terminus since 1971 at Russell Street, Emu Plains. This extension connects directly to the highway at Lapstone, bypassing the viaduct. The portion of Great Western Highway west from Russell Street to Mitchells Pass Road is now only used by local traffic to access residential properties. Mitchells Pass, travelling is now one way eastbound between Lennox Bridge and the highway, due to its narrowness. Great Western Highway traffic therefore has to use the M4 between Russell St and Governors Drive.

A major realignment west from Mount Boyce (the highest point on the highway) to eliminate the Soldiers Pinch and other nearby sharp curves was completed in 2002.

Duplication and widening
From Railway Square to Woodville Road, the highway was widened to its present width when it was reconstructed in reinforced concrete in the 1930s. From Woodville Road west to The Northern Road the highway was widened, generally progressively westward, from the mid-1960s to the late 1970s. This section is a combination of six lanes with median strip, six lanes with wide landscaped median, and four lanes undivided. At The Northern Road in Kingswood the highway reverts to a four lane undivided configuration through Penrith shopping centre, widens to six lanes at the Castlereagh Road intersection, reverts to two lanes west from Castlereagh Road to Russell Street, and is then four lanes undivided with sealed shoulders from Russell Street to the base of Mitchells Pass, where it has been truncated.

This work incorporated the dual carriageway Springwood bypass, opened in 1967.

This was completed as follows:
 road widening and realignment completed in 2006
River Lett Hill 2014/15
Old Bowenfels to Bowenfels completed in sections during the late 1990s
Bowenfels to Marrangaroo Creek mid-1970s
Marrangaroo interchange with the Castlereagh Highway 1970
Marrangaroo interchange to Lidsdale State Forest (second Cox's River deviation) 1993.

From Lidsdale State Forest as far west as Glanmire most of the highway is three lanes, with almost continuous overtaking lanes alternating between eastbound and westbound.

Controversy
Many people, including Aboriginal communities, are complaining about the expansion works. The completed highway will destroy a lot of native lands. There are also fears that the highway could wipe out platypus populations.

Current projects
 Repairs and enhancements from Victoria Pass to Lithgow. The bridge at Victoria Pass is being refurbished and kept as two lane (one each direction.)
 Forty Bends upgrade (from top of River Lett Hill to Magpie Hollow Road) – consists of extension of the length of three-lane pavement and measures to reduce the incidence of black ice in winter
 Duplication from Ashworth Drive to Stockland Drive Kelso (in Bathurst).

Route numbers
Current route numbering is extremely confusing, considering its numerous allocation history, as follows:
City Road to Hume Highway (Liverpool Road) Ashfield – A22, following the introduction of the 'Metroads' in the late 1990s. Before M5 East was opened in late 2001 it was Metroad 5. After 2001 it was State Route 31.
Liverpool Road, Ashfield to Wattle Street, Haberfield – no route number since the diversion via Stage 3, City West Link on 2 June 2000.
Wattle Street, Haberfield to M4 Western Motorway intersection at Strathfield – A44, following the opening of M4 East in July 2019. Before this, it was part of the A4.
M4 Western Motorway intersection at Strathfield to Russell Street, Emu Plains – A44.
Russell Street-M4 at Lapstone (Knapsack Viaduct now closed) – no number.
M4 at Lapstone to intersection of Mitchell and Mid-Western Highways in Bathurst (end of Great Western Highway) – A32.

Route number changes
Great Western Highway was allocated part of National Route 32 (Sydney-Adelaide via Dubbo and Broken Hill) in 1955, with the section from Hume Highway (Liverpool Road) in Summer Hill to Chippendale sharing a concurrency with National Route 31. As sections of Western Freeway opened between the late 1960s and the mid-1980s, National Route 32 was diverted off Great Western Highway and onto the freeway on the opening of each section: from 1974, sections of the highway formerly allocated National Route 32 were allocated State Route 44 instead. Metroad 4 replaced National Route 32 across the entire freeway from Emu Plains to North Strathfield - and Great Western Highway from North Strathfield to Chippendale - in 1992, and Metroad 5 replaced National Route 31 from Summer Hill to Chippendale, also in 1992: Great Western Highway switched between National Route 32 and State Route 44 at Emu Plains, and between State Route 44 and Metroad 4 at North Strathfield, and was also concurrent with Metroad 5 from Summer Hill to Chippendale. Metroad 4 was diverted along City Link West at Haberfield in 2000 and wasn't replaced, while Metroad 5 was diverted along the M5 East Motorway when it opened in 2001, and was replaced with State Route 31, leaving a short gap between Haberfield and Summer Hill that even today remains unallocated.

With the conversion to the newer alphanumeric system in 2013, State Route 44 was replaced with route A44, Metroad 4 was replaced with route A4, and State Route 31 was replaced with route A22. When M4 East opened between Strathfield and Haberfield in July 2019, route M4 was rerouted onto the new motorway. As a result, the section of Great Western Highway/Parramatta Road between Strathfield and Haberfield was designated A44, replacing the previous A4 designation.

Former route numbers
Great Western Highway has many former route allocations, including former National Route 32. Where and when the former route numbers were implemented are stated below.

Chippendale – Summer Hill:
 National Route 31 
 Metroad 4 
 National Route 32 
 Metroad 5 
 State Route 31 
 A22 
Summer Hill – Haberfield:
 National Route 32 
 Metroad 4 
unallocated: 
Haberfield – North Strathfield:
 National Route 32 
 Metroad 4 
 A4 
 A44 
North Strathfield – Auburn:
 National Route 32 
 State Route 44 
 A44 
Auburn – Clyde:
 National Route 32 
 State Route 44 
 A44 
Clyde – Granville:
 National Route 32 
 State Route 44 
 A44 
Granville – Mays Hill:
 National Route 32 
 State Route 44 
 A44 
Mays Hill – Prospect:
 National Route 32 
 State Route 44 
 A44 
Prospect – Eastern Creek:
 National Route 32 
 State Route 44 
 A44 
Eastern Creek – Emu Plains:
 National Route 32 
unallocated: 
 State Route 44 
 A44 
Emu Plains – Lapstone :
 National Route 32 
 Metroad 4 
 M4 
Lapstone – Bathurst:
 National Route 32 
 A32

Major junctions

See also

 Highways in Australia
 Highways in New South Wales

References

Highways in New South Wales
Highways in Sydney
Streets in Sydney
Transport in the Blue Mountains (New South Wales)